Lucas Santiago Melano (born 1 March 1993) is an Argentine footballer who plays as a forward for Sarmiento.

Club career

Belgrano
Lucas made his debut for Belgrano on 17 March 2012 where he played 13 minutes as a substitute in a match against Independiente.

Lanús
On 23 July 2013 Melano transferred to  Lanús from Belgrano. He made his debut on 4 August 2013. He was involved in Lanús' triumph in the 2013 Copa Sudamericana, scoring three goals in nine appearances during the competition. He also made two appearances in the 2014 Copa Libertadores tournament and had 19 appearances from 12 starts for Lanús during the 2013/14 regular-season.

Portland Timbers
On 17 July 2015 Portland Timbers signed Melano from Lanús. He made his Timbers debut, entering as a second-half substitute against FC Dallas on 25 July. In that game he drew a penalty kick late in the match.

On 6 December 2015, Melano and the Portland Timbers won MLS Cup defeating Columbus Crew 2–1 in Columbus, OH.

On 16 July 2019, Melano and Portland mutually agreed to terminate his contract.

Belgrano and Estudiantes (loan)
On 10 January 2017, Melano was loaned to his former club Belgrano until 31 December 2017.

For the 2017–18 season, he was loaned to Estudiantes, scoring in his first official league appearance on Aug 28, 2017. He returned to Portland Timbers on August 9, 2018.

Atlético Tucumán
On 27 July 2019, Melano signed for Atlético Tucumán.

San Lorenzo
On 11 February 2021, Melano joined San Lorenzo.

Universidad Católica
In 2022, he joined Chilean side Universidad Católica, but in July of the same year, the club and Melano ended the contract by common agreement.

Newell's Old Boys
On 31 August 2022 it was confirmed, that Melano had joined Newell's Old Boys on a one-year deal.

Career statistics

Club

Honours

Club
C.A. Lanús
Copa Sudamericana: 2013
Portland Timbers
MLS Cup: 2015
Western Conference (Playoffs): 2015

References

External links
 
 

1993 births
Living people
Argentine people of Italian descent
Argentine footballers
Argentine expatriate footballers
Argentina under-20 international footballers
Sportspeople from Córdoba Province, Argentina
Association football forwards
Argentine Primera División players
Chilean Primera División players
Major League Soccer players
USL Championship players
Club Atlético Belgrano footballers
Club Atlético Lanús footballers
Designated Players (MLS)
Portland Timbers players
Portland Timbers 2 players
Estudiantes de La Plata footballers
Atlético Tucumán footballers
San Lorenzo de Almagro footballers
Central Córdoba de Santiago del Estero footballers
Club Deportivo Universidad Católica footballers
Newell's Old Boys footballers
Argentine expatriate sportspeople in the United States
Argentine expatriate sportspeople in Chile
Expatriate soccer players in the United States
Expatriate footballers in Chile
Club Atlético Sarmiento footballers